Sebastián Saucedo Mondragón (born January 22, 1997), also known as Bofo, is an American professional soccer player who plays as a winger for Liga MX club Toluca.

Career

Professional
On July 25, 2014, Saucedo signed a homegrown contract with Real Salt Lake, making him the eighth homegrown signing in club history.  On March 22, 2015, he made his professional debut for USL affiliate club Real Monarchs SLC in a 0–0 draw against LA Galaxy II. Saucedo was sent on loan to Veracruz in 2016.

On December 9, 2019, it was announced that Saucedo would join UNAM ahead of their 2020 Clausura season.

International
Saucedo has represented both Mexico and the United States at the under-18 and under-20 levels. He has solely represented the United States since 2015. Saucedo was named to the final 20-player United States under-23 roster for the 2020 CONCACAF Men's Olympic Qualifying Championship in March 2021.

Personal
Saucedo was born in San Fernando Valley, California, and is of Mexican descent.

Honors
Veracruz 
Copa MX: Clausura 2016

United States U20
CONCACAF Under-20 Championship: 2017

References

External links

 
 Sebastian Saucedo at FIFA.com
 Sebastian Saucedo Complete Biography

1997 births
Living people
American soccer players
American sportspeople of Mexican descent
Association football midfielders
Homegrown Players (MLS)
Liga MX players
Major League Soccer players
Mexican footballers
Mexico under-20 international footballers
People from Park City, Utah
Real Monarchs players
Real Salt Lake players
Soccer players from California
Soccer players from Utah
C.D. Veracruz footballers
Club Universidad Nacional footballers
USL Championship players
United States men's under-20 international soccer players
United States men's youth international soccer players
United States men's under-23 international soccer players